Franz Joseph Haydn (31 March 173231 May 1809) was an Austrian composer of the Classical period. He was instrumental in the development of chamber music such as the string quartet and piano trio. His contributions to musical form have led him to be called "Father of the Symphony" and "Father of the String Quartet".

Haydn spent much of his career as a court musician for the wealthy Esterházy family at their Eszterháza Castle. Until the later part of his life, this isolated him from other composers and trends in music so that he was, as he put it, "forced to become original". Yet his music circulated widely, and for much of his career he was the most celebrated composer in Europe.

He was a friend and mentor of Mozart, a tutor of Beethoven, and the elder brother of composer Michael Haydn.

Life and career

Early life

Joseph Haydn was born in Rohrau, Austria, a village that at that time stood on the border with Hungary. His father was Mathias Haydn, a wheelwright who also served as "Marktrichter", an office akin to village mayor. Haydn's mother Maria,  Koller, had previously worked as a cook in the palace of Count Harrach, the presiding aristocrat of Rohrau. Neither parent could read music; however, Mathias was an enthusiastic folk musician, who during the journeyman period of his career had taught himself to play the harp. According to Haydn's later reminiscences, his childhood family was extremely musical, and frequently sang together and with their neighbours.

Haydn's parents had noticed that their son was musically gifted and knew that in Rohrau he would have no chance to obtain serious musical training. It was for this reason that, around the time Haydn turned six, they accepted a proposal from their relative Johann Matthias Frankh, the schoolmaster and choirmaster in Hainburg, that Haydn be apprenticed to Frankh in his home to train as a musician. Haydn therefore went off with Frankh to Hainburg and he never again lived with his parents.

Life in the Frankh household was not easy for Haydn, who later remembered being frequently hungry and humiliated by the filthy state of his clothing. He began his musical training there, and could soon play both harpsichord and violin.  He also sang treble parts in the church choir.

There is reason to think that Haydn's singing impressed those who heard him, because in 1739 he was brought to the attention of Georg von Reutter, the director of music in St. Stephen's Cathedral in Vienna, who happened to be visiting Hainburg and was looking for new choirboys. Haydn passed his audition with Reutter, and after several months of further training moved to Vienna (1740), where he worked for the next nine years as a chorister. It is also popularly believed that  Haydn sang at the funeral of Antonio Vivaldi in 1741. 

Haydn lived in the Kapellhaus next to the cathedral, along with Reutter, Reutter's family, and the other four choirboys, which after 1745 included his younger brother Michael. The choirboys were instructed in Latin and other school subjects as well as voice, violin, and keyboard. Reutter was of little help to Haydn in the areas of music theory and composition, giving him only two lessons in his entire time as chorister. However, since St. Stephen's was one of the leading musical centres in Europe, Haydn learned a great deal simply by serving as a professional musician there.

Like Frankh before him, Reutter did not always bother to make sure Haydn was properly fed. As he later told his biographer Albert Christoph Dies, Haydn was motivated to sing well, in hopes of gaining more invitations to perform before aristocratic audiences, where the singers were usually served refreshments.

Struggles as a freelancer 
By 1749, Haydn had matured physically to the point that he was no longer able to sing high choral parts. Empress Maria Theresa herself complained to Reutter about his singing, calling it "crowing". One day, Haydn carried out a prank, snipping off the pigtail of a fellow chorister. This was enough for Reutter: Haydn was first caned, then summarily dismissed and sent into the streets. He had the good fortune to be taken in by a friend, Johann Michael Spangler, who shared his family's crowded garret room with Haydn for a few months. Haydn immediately began his pursuit of a career as a freelance musician.

Haydn struggled at first, working at many different jobs: as a music teacher, as a street serenader, and eventually, in 1752, as valet–accompanist for the Italian composer Nicola Porpora, from whom he later said he learned "the true fundamentals of composition". He was also briefly in Count Friedrich Wilhelm von Haugwitz's employ, playing the organ in the Bohemian Chancellery chapel at the Judenplatz.

While a chorister, Haydn had not received any systematic training in music theory and composition. As a remedy, he worked his way through the counterpoint exercises in the text Gradus ad Parnassum by Johann Joseph Fux and carefully studied the work of Carl Philipp Emanuel Bach, whom he later acknowledged as an important influence. He said of CPE Bach's first six keyboard sonatas, "I did not leave my clavier till I played them through, and whoever knows me thoroughly must discover that I owe a great deal to Emanuel Bach, that I understood him and have studied him with diligence." According to Griesinger and Dies, in the 1750s Haydn studied an encyclopedic treatise by Johann Mattheson, a German composer.

As his skills increased, Haydn began to acquire a public reputation, first as the composer of an opera, Der krumme Teufel, "The Limping Devil", written for the comic actor , whose stage name was "Bernardon". The work was premiered successfully in 1753, but was soon closed down by the censors due to "offensive remarks". Haydn also noticed, apparently without annoyance, that works he had simply given away were being published and sold in local music shops. Between 1754 and 1756 Haydn also worked freelance for the court in Vienna. He was among several musicians who were paid for services as supplementary musicians at balls given for the imperial children during carnival season, and as supplementary singers in the imperial chapel (the Hofkapelle) in Lent and Holy Week.

With the increase in his reputation, Haydn eventually obtained aristocratic patronage, crucial for the career of a composer in his day. Countess Thun, having seen one of Haydn's compositions, summoned him and engaged him as her singing and keyboard teacher. In 1756, Baron Carl Josef Fürnberg employed Haydn at his country estate, Weinzierl, where the composer wrote his first string quartets. Of them, Philip G. Downs said "they abound in novel effects and instrumental combinations that can only be the result of humorous intent". Their enthusiastic reception encouraged Haydn to write more. It was a turning point in his career. As a result of the performances, he became in great demand both as a performer and a teacher. Fürnberg later recommended Haydn to Count Morzin, who, in 1757, became his first full-time employer. His salary was a respectable 200 florins a year, plus free board and lodging.

The years as Kapellmeister

Haydn's job title under Count Morzin was Kapellmeister, that is, music director. He led the count's small orchestra in Unterlukawitz and wrote his first symphonies for this ensemble – perhaps numbering in the double figures. Philip Downs comments of these first symphonies: "the seeds of the future are there, his works already exhibit a richness and profusion of material, and a disciplined yet varied expression." In 1760, with the security of a Kapellmeister position, Haydn married. His wife was the former Maria Anna Theresia Keller (1729–1800), the sister of Therese (b. 1733), with whom Haydn had previously been in love. Haydn and his wife had a completely unhappy marriage, from which time permitted no escape. They produced no children, and both took lovers.

Count Morzin soon suffered financial reverses that forced him to dismiss his musical establishment, but Haydn was quickly offered a similar job (1761) by Prince Paul Anton, head of the immensely wealthy Esterházy family. Haydn's job title was only Vice-Kapellmeister, but he was immediately placed in charge of most of the Esterházy musical establishment, with the old Kapellmeister Gregor Werner retaining authority only for church music. When Werner died in 1766, Haydn was elevated to full Kapellmeister.

As a "house officer" in the Esterházy establishment, Haydn wore livery and followed the family as they moved among their various palaces, most importantly the family's ancestral seat Schloss Esterházy in Eisenstadt and later on Esterháza, a grand new palace built in rural Hungary in the 1760s. Haydn had a huge range of responsibilities, including composition, running the orchestra, playing chamber music for and with his patrons, and eventually the mounting of operatic productions. Despite this backbreaking workload, the job was in artistic terms a superb opportunity for Haydn. The Esterházy princes (Paul Anton, then from 1762 to 1790 Nikolaus I) were musical connoisseurs who appreciated his work and gave him daily access to his own small orchestra. During the nearly thirty years that Haydn worked at the Esterházy court, he produced a flood of compositions, and his musical style continued to develop.

Much of Haydn's activity at the time followed the musical taste of his patron Prince Nikolaus. In about 1765, the prince obtained and began to learn to play the baryton, an uncommon musical instrument similar to the bass viol, but with a set of plucked sympathetic strings. Haydn was commanded to provide music for the prince to play, and over the next ten years produced about 200 works for this instrument in various ensembles, the most notable of which are the 126 baryton trios. Around 1775, the prince abandoned the baryton and took up a new hobby: opera productions, previously a sporadic event for special occasions, became the focus of musical life at court, and the opera theater the prince had built at Esterháza came to host a major season, with multiple productions each year. Haydn served as company director, recruiting and training the singers and preparing and leading the performances. He wrote several of the operas performed and wrote substitution arias to insert into the operas of other composers.

1779 was a watershed year for Haydn, as his contract was renegotiated: whereas previously all his compositions were the property of the Esterházy family, he now was permitted to write for others and sell his work to publishers. Haydn soon shifted his emphasis in composition to reflect this (fewer operas, and more quartets and symphonies) and he negotiated with multiple publishers, both Austrian and foreign. His new employment contract "acted as a catalyst in the next stage in Haydn's career, the achievement of international popularity. By 1790 Haydn was in the paradoxical position ... of being Europe's leading composer, but someone who spent his time as a duty-bound Kapellmeister in a remote palace in the Hungarian countryside." The new publication campaign resulted in the composition of a great number of new string quartets (the six-quartet sets of Op. 33, 50, 54/55, and 64). Haydn also composed in response to commissions from abroad: the Paris symphonies (1785–1786) and the original orchestral version of The Seven Last Words of Christ (1786), a commission from Cádiz, Spain.

The remoteness of Eszterháza, which was farther from Vienna than Eisenstadt, led Haydn gradually to feel more isolated and lonely. He longed to visit Vienna because of his friendships there. Of these, a particularly important one was with Maria Anna von Genzinger (1754–1793), the wife of Prince Nikolaus's personal physician in Vienna, who began a close, platonic relationship with the composer in 1789. Haydn wrote to Mrs. Genzinger often, expressing his loneliness at Esterháza and his happiness for the few occasions on which he was able to visit her in Vienna. Later on, Haydn wrote to her frequently from London. Her premature death in 1793 was a blow to Haydn, and his F minor variations for piano, Hob. XVII:6, may have been written in response to her death.

Another friend in Vienna was Wolfgang Amadeus Mozart, whom Haydn had met sometime around 1784. According to later testimony by Michael Kelly and others, the two composers occasionally played in string quartets together. Haydn was hugely impressed with Mozart's work and praised it unstintingly to others. Mozart evidently returned the esteem, as seen in his dedication of a set of six quartets, now called the "Haydn" quartets, to his friend. In 1785 Haydn was admitted to the same Masonic lodge as Mozart, the "" in Vienna.

The London journeys 

In 1790, Prince Nikolaus died and was succeeded as prince by his son Anton. Following a trend of the time, Anton sought to economize by dismissing most of the court musicians. Haydn retained a nominal appointment with Anton, at a reduced salary of 400 florins, as well as a 1000-florin pension from Nikolaus. Since Anton had little need of Haydn's services, he was willing to let him travel, and the composer accepted a lucrative offer from Johann Peter Salomon, a German violinist and impresario, to visit England and conduct new symphonies with a large orchestra.

The choice was a sensible one because Haydn was already a very popular composer there. Since the death of Johann Christian Bach in 1782, Haydn's music had dominated the concert scene in London; "hardly a concert did not feature a work by him". Haydn's work was widely distributed by publishers in London, including Forster (who had their own contract with Haydn) and Longman & Broderip (who served as agent in England for Haydn's Vienna publisher Artaria). Efforts to bring Haydn to London had been made since 1782, though Haydn's loyalty to Prince Nikolaus had prevented him from accepting.

After fond farewells from Mozart and other friends, Haydn departed from Vienna with Salomon on 15 December 1790, arriving in Calais in time to cross the English Channel on New Year's Day of 1791. It was the first time that the 58-year-old composer had seen the sea. Arriving in London, Haydn stayed with Salomon in Great Pulteney Street (London, near Piccadilly Circus) working in a borrowed studio at the Broadwood piano firm nearby.

It was the start of a very auspicious period for Haydn: both the 1791–1792 journey, along with a repeat visit in 1794–1795, were greatly successful. Audiences flocked to Haydn's concerts; he augmented his fame and made large profits, thus becoming financially secure. Charles Burney reviewed the first concert thus: "Haydn himself presided at the piano-forte; and the sight of that renowned composer so electrified the audience, as to excite an attention and a pleasure superior to any that had ever been caused by instrumental music in England." Haydn made many new friends and, for a time, was involved in a romantic relationship with Rebecca Schroeter.

Musically, Haydn's visits to England generated some of his best-known work, including the Surprise, Military, Drumroll and London symphonies; the Rider quartet; and the "Gypsy Rondo" piano trio. The great success of the overall enterprise does not mean that the journeys were free of trouble. Notably, his very first project, the commissioned opera L'anima del filosofo was duly written during the early stages of the trip, but the opera's impresario John Gallini was unable to obtain a license to permit opera performances in the theatre he directed, the King's Theatre. Haydn was well paid for the opera (£300) but much time was wasted. Thus only two new symphonies, no. 95 and no. 96 Miracle, could be premiered in the 12 concerts of Salomon's spring concert series in 1791. Another problem arose from the jealously competitive efforts of a senior, rival orchestra, the Professional Concerts, who recruited Haydn's old pupil Ignaz Pleyel as a rival visiting composer; the two composers, refusing to play along with the concocted rivalry, dined together and put each other's symphonies on their concert programs.

The end of Salomon's series in June gave Haydn a rare period of relative leisure. He spent some of the time in the country (Hertingfordbury), but also had time to travel, notably to Oxford, where he was awarded an honorary doctorate by the university. The symphony performed for the occasion, no. 92 has since come to be known as the Oxford Symphony, although it had been written in 1789. Four further new symphonies (Nos. 93, 94, 97 and 98) were performed in early 1792.

While traveling to London in 1790, Haydn had met the young Ludwig van Beethoven in his native city of Bonn. On Haydn's return, Beethoven came to Vienna and was Haydn's pupil up until the second London journey. Haydn took Beethoven with him to Eisenstadt for the summer, where Haydn had little to do, and taught Beethoven some counterpoint. While in Vienna, Haydn purchased a house for himself and his wife in the suburbs and started remodeling it. He also arranged for the performance of some of his London symphonies in local concerts.

By the time he arrived on his second journey to England (1794–1795), Haydn had become a familiar figure on the London concert scene. The 1794 season was dominated by Salomon's ensemble, as the Professional Concerts had abandoned their efforts. The concerts included the premieres of the 99th, 100th, and 101st symphonies. For 1795, Salomon had abandoned his own series, citing difficulty in obtaining "vocal performers of the first rank from abroad", and Haydn joined forces with the Opera Concerts, headed by the violinist Giovanni Battista Viotti. These were the venue of the last three symphonies, 102, 103, and 104. The final benefit concert for Haydn ("Dr. Haydn's night") at the end of the 1795 season was a great success and was perhaps the peak of his English career. Haydn's biographer Griesinger wrote that Haydn "considered the days spent in England the happiest of his life. He was everywhere appreciated there; it opened a new world to him".

Years of celebrity in Vienna 
Haydn returned to Vienna in 1795. Prince Anton had died, and his successor Nikolaus II proposed that the Esterházy musical establishment be revived with Haydn serving again as Kapellmeister. Haydn took up the position on a part-time basis. He spent his summers with the Esterházys in Eisenstadt, and over the course of several years wrote six masses for them including the Lord Nelson mass in 1798.

By this time Haydn had become a public figure in Vienna. He spent most of his time in his home, a large house in the suburb of Windmühle, and wrote works for public performance. In collaboration with his librettist and mentor Gottfried van Swieten, and with funding from van Swieten's Gesellschaft der Associierten, he composed his two great oratorios, The Creation (1798) and The Seasons (1801). Both were enthusiastically received. Haydn frequently appeared before the public, often leading performances of The Creation and The Seasons for charity benefits, including Tonkünstler-Societät programs with massed musical forces. He also composed instrumental music: the popular Trumpet Concerto, and the last nine in his long series of string quartets, including the Fifths, Emperor, and Sunrise. Directly inspired by hearing audiences sing God Save the King in London, in 1797 Haydn wrote a patriotic "Emperor's Hymn" Gott erhalte Franz den Kaiser, ("God Save Emperor Francis"). This achieved great success and became "the enduring emblem of Austrian identity right up to the First World War" (Jones). The melody was used for von Fallersleben's Deutschlandlied (1841), which was written as part of the German unification movement and whose third stanza is today the national anthem of the Federal Republic of Germany. (Modern Austria uses a different anthem.)

During the later years of this successful period, Haydn faced incipient old age and fluctuating health, and he had to struggle to complete his final works. His last major work, from 1802, was the sixth mass for the Esterházys, the Harmoniemesse.

Retirement, illness, and death
By the end of 1803, Haydn's condition had declined to the point that he became physically unable to compose. He suffered from weakness, dizziness, inability to concentrate and painfully swollen legs. Since diagnosis was uncertain in Haydn's time, it is unlikely that the precise illness can ever be identified, though Jones suggests arteriosclerosis. The illness was especially hard for Haydn because the flow of fresh musical ideas continued unabated, although he could no longer work them out as compositions. His biographer Dies reported Haydn saying in 1806:

"I must have something to do—usually musical ideas are pursuing me, to the point of torture, I cannot escape them, they stand like walls before me. If it's an allegro that pursues me, my pulse keeps beating faster, I can get no sleep. If it's an adagio, then I notice my pulse beating slowly. My imagination plays on me as if I were a clavier." Haydn smiled, the blood rushed to his face, and he said "I am really just a living clavier."

The winding down of Haydn's career was gradual. The Esterházy family kept him on as Kapellmeister to the very end (much as they had with his predecessor Werner long before), but they  appointed new staff to lead their musical establishment: Johann Michael Fuchs in 1802 as Vice-Kapellmeister and Johann Nepomuk Hummel as Konzertmeister in 1804. Haydn's last summer in Eisenstadt was in 1803, and his last appearance before the public as a conductor was a charity performance of The Seven Last Words on 26 December 1803. As debility set in, he made largely futile efforts at composition, attempting to revise a rediscovered Missa brevis from his teenage years and complete his final string quartet. The former project was abandoned for good in 1805, and the quartet was published with just two movements.

Haydn was well cared for by his servants, and he received many visitors and public honors during his last years, but they could not have been very happy years for him. During his illness, Haydn often found solace by sitting at the piano and playing his "Emperor's Hymn". A final triumph occurred on 27 March 1808 when a performance of The Creation was organized in his honour. The very frail composer was brought into the hall on an armchair to the sound of trumpets and drums and was greeted by Beethoven, Salieri (who led the performance) and by other musicians and members of the aristocracy. Haydn was both moved and exhausted by the experience and had to depart at intermission.

Haydn lived on for 14 more months. His final days were hardly serene, as in May 1809 the French army under Napoleon launched an attack on Vienna and on 10 May bombarded his neighborhood. According to Griesinger, "Four case shots fell, rattling the windows and doors of his house. He called out in a loud voice to his alarmed and frightened people, 'Don't be afraid, children, where Haydn is, no harm can reach you!'. But the spirit was stronger than the flesh, for he had hardly uttered the brave words when his whole body began to tremble." More bombardments followed until the city fell to the French on 13 May. Haydn, was, however, deeply moved and appreciative when on 17 May a French cavalry officer named Sulémy came to pay his respects and sang, skillfully, an aria from The Creation.

On 26 May Haydn played his "Emperor's Hymn" with unusual gusto three times; the same evening he collapsed and was taken to what proved to be to his deathbed. He died peacefully in his own home at 12:40 a.m. on 31 May 1809, aged 77. On 15 June, a memorial service was held in the Schottenkirche at which Mozart's Requiem was performed. Haydn's remains were interred in the local Hundsturm cemetery until 1820, when they were moved to Eisenstadt by Prince Nikolaus. His head took a different journey; it was stolen by phrenologists shortly after burial, and the skull was reunited with the other remains only in 1954, now interred in a tomb in the north tower of the Bergkirche.

Character and appearance

James Webster writes of Haydn's public character thus: "Haydn's public life exemplified the Enlightenment ideal of the honnête homme (honest man): the man whose good character and worldly success enable and justify each other. His modesty and probity were everywhere acknowledged. These traits were not only prerequisites to his success as Kapellmeister, entrepreneur and public figure, but also aided the favorable reception of his music." Haydn was especially respected by the Esterházy court musicians whom he supervised, as he maintained a cordial working atmosphere and effectively represented the musicians' interests with their employer; see Papa Haydn and the tale of the "Farewell" Symphony. Haydn had a robust sense of humor, evident in his love of practical jokes and often apparent in his music, and he had many friends. For much of his life he benefited from a "happy and naturally cheerful temperament", but in his later life, there is evidence for periods of depression, notably in the correspondence with Mrs. Genzinger and in Dies's biography, based on visits made in Haydn's old age.

Haydn was a devout Catholic who often turned to his rosary when he had trouble composing, a practice that he usually found to be effective. He normally began the manuscript of each composition with "in nomine Domini" ("in the name of the Lord") and ended with "Laus Deo" ("praise be to God").

Haydn's early years of poverty and awareness of the financial precariousness of musical life made him astute and even sharp in his business dealings. Some contemporaries (usually, it has to be said, wealthy ones) were surprised and even shocked at this. Webster writes: "As regards money, Haydn…always attempted to maximize his income, whether by negotiating the right to sell his music outside the Esterházy court, driving hard bargains with publishers or selling his works three and four times over [to publishers in different countries]; he regularly engaged in 'sharp practice'” which nowadays might be regarded as plain fraud. But those were days when copyright was in its infancy, and the pirating of musical works was common. Publishers had few qualms about attaching Haydn's name to popular works by lesser composers, an arrangement that effectively robbed the lesser musician of livelihood. Webster notes that Haydn's ruthlessness in business might be viewed more sympathetically in light of his struggles with poverty during his years as a freelancer—and that outside of the world of business, in his dealings, for example, with relatives, musicians and servants, and in volunteering his services for charitable concerts, Haydn was a generous man – offering to teach the two infant sons of Mozart for free after their father's death. When Haydn died he was certainly comfortably off, but by middle class rather than aristocratic standards.

Haydn was short in stature, perhaps as a result of having been underfed throughout most of his youth. He was not handsome, and like many in his day he was a survivor of smallpox; his face was pitted with the scars of this disease. His biographer Dies wrote: "he couldn't understand how it happened that in his life he had been loved by many a pretty woman. 'They couldn't have been led to it by my beauty.

His nose, large and aquiline, was disfigured by the polyps he suffered during much of his adult life, an agonizing and debilitating disease that at times prevented him from writing music.

Works

James Webster summarizes Haydn's role in the history of classical music as follows: "He excelled in every musical genre. ... He is familiarly known as the 'father of the symphony' because he composed 107 symphonies, and could with greater justice be thus regarded for the string quartet; no other composer approaches his combination of productivity, quality and historical importance in these genres."

Structure and character of his music 
A central characteristic of Haydn's music is the development of larger structures out of very short, simple musical motifs, often derived from standard accompanying figures. The music is often quite formally concentrated, and the important musical events of a movement can unfold rather quickly.

Haydn's work was central to the development of what came to be called sonata form. His practice, however, differed in some ways from that of Mozart and Beethoven, his younger contemporaries who likewise excelled in this form of composition. Haydn was particularly fond of the so-called monothematic exposition, in which the music that establishes the dominant key is similar or identical to the opening theme. Haydn also differs from Mozart and Beethoven in his recapitulation sections, where he often rearranges the order of themes compared to the exposition and uses extensive thematic development.

Haydn's formal inventiveness also led him to integrate the fugue into the classical style and to enrich the rondo form with more cohesive tonal logic (see sonata rondo form). Haydn was also the principal exponent of the double variation form—variations on two alternating themes, which are often major- and minor-mode versions of each other.

Perhaps more than any other composer's, Haydn's music is known for its humor. The most famous example is the sudden loud chord in the slow movement of his "Surprise" symphony; Haydn's many other musical jokes include numerous false endings (e.g., in the quartets Op. 33 No. 2 and Op. 50 No. 3), and the remarkable rhythmic illusion placed in the trio section of the third movement of Op. 50 No. 1.

Much of the music was written to please and delight a prince, and its emotional tone is correspondingly upbeat. This tone also reflects, perhaps, Haydn's fundamentally healthy and well-balanced personality. Occasional minor-key works, often deadly serious in character, form striking exceptions to the general rule. Haydn's fast movements tend to be rhythmically propulsive and often impart a great sense of energy, especially in the finales. Some characteristic examples of Haydn's "rollicking" finale type are found in the "London" Symphony No. 104, the String Quartet Op. 50 No. 1, and the Piano Trio Hob XV: 27. Haydn's early slow movements are usually not too slow in tempo, relaxed, and reflective. Later on, the emotional range of the slow movements increases, notably in the deeply felt slow movements of the quartets Op. 76 Nos. 3 and 5, the Symphonies No. 98 and 102, and the Piano Trio Hob XV: 23. The minuets tend to have a strong downbeat and a clearly popular character. Over time, Haydn turned some of his minuets into "scherzi" which are much faster, at one beat to the bar.

One of the most apt tributes to Haydn was spoken by the poet John Keats. Keats, dying of tuberculosis, was brought to Rome by his friends in November 1820, in the hope that the climate might help to mitigate his suffering. (The poet died a few weeks later on 23 February 1821, at the age of 25.) According to his friend Joseph Severn: "About this time he expressed a strong desire that we had a pianoforte, so that I might play to him, for not only was he passionately fond of music, but found that his constant pain and o'erfretted nerves were much soothed by it. This I managed to obtain on loan, and Dr. Clark procured me many volumes and pieces of music, and Keats had thus a welcome solace in the dreary hours he had to pass. Among the volumes was one of Haydn's Symphonies, and these were his delight, and he would exclaim enthusiastically, 'This Haydn is like a child, for there is no knowing what he will do next.' "

Style
Haydn's early work dates from a period in which the compositional style of the High Baroque (seen in J. S. Bach and Handel) had gone out of fashion. This was a period of exploration and uncertainty, and Haydn, born 18 years before the death of Bach, was himself one of the musical explorers of this time. An older contemporary whose work Haydn acknowledged as an important influence was Carl Philipp Emanuel Bach.

Tracing Haydn's work over the six decades in which it was produced (roughly from 1749 to 1802), one finds a gradual but steady increase in complexity and musical sophistication, which developed as Haydn learned from his own experience and that of his colleagues. Several important landmarks have been observed in the evolution of Haydn's musical style.

In the late 1760s and early 1770s, Haydn entered a stylistic period known as "Sturm und Drang" ("storm and stress"). This term is taken from a literary movement of about the same time, though it appears that the musical development actually preceded the literary one by a few years. The musical language of this period is similar to what went before, but it is deployed in work that is more intensely expressive, especially in the works in minor keys. James Webster describes the works of this period as "longer, more passionate, and more daring". Some of the most famous compositions of this time are the "Trauer" (Mourning) Symphony No. 44, "Farewell" Symphony No. 45, the Piano Sonata in C minor (Hob. XVI/20, L. 33), and the six "Sun" Quartets Op. 20, all from c. 1771–72. It was also around this time that Haydn became interested in writing fugues in the Baroque style, and three of the Op. 20 quartets end with a fugue.

Following the climax of the "Sturm und Drang", Haydn returned to a lighter, more overtly entertaining style. There are no quartets from this period, and the symphonies take on new features: the scoring often includes trumpets and timpani. These changes are often related to a major shift in Haydn's professional duties, which moved him away from "pure" music and toward the production of comic operas. Several of the operas were Haydn's own work (see List of operas by Joseph Haydn); these are seldom performed today. Haydn sometimes recycled his opera music in symphonic works, which helped him continue his career as a symphonist during this hectic decade.

In 1779, an important change in Haydn's contract permitted him to publish his compositions without prior authorization from his employer. This may have encouraged Haydn to rekindle his career as a composer of "pure" music. The change made itself felt most dramatically in 1781, when Haydn published the six Op. 33 String Quartets, announcing (in a letter to potential purchasers) that they were written in "a new and completely special way". Charles Rosen has argued that this assertion on Haydn's part was not just sales talk but meant quite seriously, and he points out a number of important advances in Haydn's compositional technique that appear in these quartets, advances that mark the advent of the Classical style in full flower. These include a fluid form of phrasing, in which each motif emerges from the previous one without interruption, the practice of letting accompanying material evolve into melodic material, and a kind of "Classical counterpoint" in which each instrumental part maintains its own integrity. These traits continue in the many quartets that Haydn wrote after Op. 33.

In the 1790s, stimulated by his England journeys, Haydn developed what Rosen calls his "popular style", a method of composition that, with unprecedented success, created music having great popular appeal but retaining a learned and rigorous musical structure. An important element of the popular style was the frequent use of folk or folk-like material (see Haydn and folk music). Haydn took care to deploy this material in appropriate locations, such as the endings of sonata expositions or the opening themes of finales. In such locations, the folk material serves as an element of stability, helping to anchor the larger structure. Haydn's popular style can be heard in virtually all of his later work, including the twelve "London" symphonies, the late quartets and piano trios, and the two late oratorios.

The return to Vienna in 1795 marked the last turning point in Haydn's career. Although his musical style evolved little, his intentions as a composer changed. While he had been a servant, and later a busy entrepreneur, Haydn wrote his works quickly and in profusion, with frequent deadlines. As a rich man, Haydn now felt that he had the privilege of taking his time and writing for posterity. This is reflected in the subject matter of The Creation (1798) and The Seasons (1801), which address such weighty topics as the meaning of life and the purpose of humankind and represent an attempt to render the sublime in music. Haydn's new intentions also meant that he was willing to spend much time on a single work: both oratorios took him over a year to complete. Haydn once remarked that he had worked on The Creation so long because he wanted it to last.

The change in Haydn's approach was important in the history of classical music, as other composers were soon following his lead. Notably, Beethoven adopted the practice of taking his time and aiming high.

Identifying Haydn's works
Anthony van Hoboken prepared a comprehensive catalogue of Haydn's works. The Hoboken catalogue assigns a catalog number to each work, called its Hoboken number (abbreviated H. or Hob.). These Hoboken numbers are often used in identifying Haydn's compositions.

Haydn's string quartets also have Hoboken numbers, but they are usually identified instead by their opus numbers, which have the advantage of indicating the groups of six quartets that Haydn published together. For example, the string quartet Opus 76, No. 3 is the third of the six quartets published in 1799 as Opus 76.

Instruments
In Vienna in 1788 Haydn bought himself a fortepiano made by Wenzel Schantz. When the composer was visiting London for the first time, an English piano builder, John Broadwood, supplied him with a concert grand.

See also

 List of compositions by Joseph Haydn
 List of concertos by Joseph Haydn
 List of masses by Joseph Haydn
 List of operas by Joseph Haydn
 List of piano trios by Joseph Haydn
 List of solo piano compositions by Joseph Haydn
 List of string quartets by Joseph Haydn
 List of symphonies by Joseph Haydn
 Joseph Haydn's ethnicity
 Haydn's birthplace
 List of Haydn's residences

References
Informational notes

Citations

Bibliography

Biographical sources

 Classic FM Franz Joseph Haydn (1732–1809): Composer: Biography, Music and facts. Classic FM. (n.d.). Retrieved September 15, 2022,

  English translation in:  One of the first biographies of Haydn, written on the basis of 30 interviews carried out during the composer's old age.
  Highly detailed discussion of life and work; in German.
  The first edition was published in 1946 with Karl Geiringer as the sole author.
  A translation from the original German: . Like Dies's, a biography produced from interviews with the elderly Haydn.
  Reissued 2010 by Cambridge University Press.
  Originally published in 1950. Gives a sympathetic and witty account of Haydn's life, along with a survey of the music.
  Focuses on biography rather than musical works; an up-to-date study benefiting from recent scholarly research on Haydn's life and times.
  A comprehensive one-volume collection of detailed contributions by Haydn scholars.
  An extensive compilation of original sources in five volumes.
Analysis and appreciation of the works by Jones.
  Published separately as 
 
  Published separately as a book:  Careful scholarship with little subjective interpretation; covers both life and music, and includes a very detailed list of works.

Criticism and analysis
  On jokes in Haydn and Beethoven.
  Surveys the decline in Haydn's reputation in the nineteenth century before examining the factors that led to a resurgence in the twentieth.
  First edition published in 1971. Covers much of Haydn's output and seeks to explicate Haydn's central role in the creation of the classical style. The work has been influential, provoking both positive citation and work (e.g., Webster 1991) written in reaction.
 . Further discussion of Haydn's style and technique as it relates to sonata form.
 
 
  This book focuses on a single work, but contains many observations and opinions about Haydn in general.

Further reading
  On the sublime in Haydn's later works; in German.
  Covers each of the genres Haydn composed in as well as stylistic and interpretive contexts and performance and reception.
  Sixty-seven scholars contribute over eighty entries as well as seven longer thematic essays on biography and identity, ideas, institutions, musical materials, people and networks, performance, and place.
 
  A brief (55 page) introduction to Haydn's string quartets.
 
  Covers not just Op. 50 but also its relevance to Haydn's other output as well as his earlier quartets.

External links

 Britannica, Joseph Haydn 

 
 
 Joseph Haydn-Institut (in German)
 The Haydn Society of North America
 

 
1732 births
1809 deaths
18th-century Austrian people
18th-century classical composers
18th-century male musicians
19th-century male musicians
Age of Enlightenment
Austrian classical pianists
Austrian Classical-period composers
Austrian expatriates in Hungary
Austrian Freemasons
Austrian male classical composers
Austrian opera composers
Austrian Roman Catholics
Catholic liturgical composers
Composers for piano
Composers from Vienna
Esterházy family
Harrach family
Male classical pianists
Male opera composers
National anthem writers
Oratorio composers
People from Bruck an der Leitha District
Pupils of Nicola Porpora
String quartet composers